The Future Foundation is a fictional organization appearing in American comic books published by Marvel Comics. Created by writer Jonathan Hickman, the team first appeared in Fantastic Four #579 (July 2010) and stars in the series FF, written by Hickman and illustrated by Steve Epting. The Future Foundation is a philanthropic organization created by Mister Fantastic to better serve humanity's future.

Publication History
Jonathan Hickman launched FF in May 2011 with various artists assisting him. The volume ran for 23 issues.

As part of Marvel NOW!, FF was relaunched with creative team of Matt Fraction and Mike Allred in November 2012 and ended with issue #16 in January 2014.

A new volume of Future Foundation was released by writer Jeremy Whitley in 2019, but was canceled after five issues due to low sales.

Fictional history
After becoming discouraged by how Earth's scientists view science and its applications, Mister Fantastic forms a new group to create a better future for all of humanity. After the death of the Human Torch in "Annihilation," Mister Fantastic plans to mold the young and great minds he has gathered into a team that will form solutions to the world's problems.

Zero-G (Alex Power); Dragon Man; evolved Moloids Tong, Turg, Mik, and Korr; and Bentley 23 (a clone of the Wizard) are the first recruits to the organization. Artie Maddicks then joins the Future Foundation, as does Leech.

The organization next gains Mister Fantastic's father Nathaniel Richards followed by Uhari co-heirs Vii and Wuu. Spider-Man joins the team as well at a final request from Human Torch. Mister Fantastic is disturbed to discover that his daughter and father have also invited Doctor Doom to join, following Valeria's proposition for Doctor Doom to help the Future Foundation. After learning about Doctor Doom being a member of the Future Foundation, the Thing objects and attacks him, but Mister Fantastic and Invisible Woman break up the fight. Later, Reed takes everyone to the Room, a classroom where the Future Foundation has sharing time and naps. One of their early projects is to create a stylish tuxedo for the Thing. When Valeria asks Doctor Doom if he has a backup for restoring his memories, he reveals that Kristoff Vernard is his best man. Afterward, Mr. Fantastic, Spider-Man, Nathaniel, Valeria, and Doctor Doom head to Latveria to meet with Kristoff and request his help. Mister Fantastic sets up a brain-transfer machine to help restore Doctor Doom's memories and knowledge, which is successful. When Kristoff wants to return the lawnmower of eternity to him, Doctor Doom states that it is not time yet because of a promise he made to Valeria. When Mister Fantastic asks what promise Doctor Doom made to Valeria, Doctor Doom states that he made a promise to help defeat Mister Fantastic.

Doctor Doom decides to hold a symposium on how to finally defeat Reed Richards. The Thing and the evolved Moloids give an invitation to the High Evolutionary. Dragon Man and Alex Power give an invitation to Diablo. Upon receiving an invitation from Spider-Man, Mad Thinker is convinced to take part in the event. Bentley 23 even gives an invitation to his creator, the Wizard, along with two A.I.M. lieutenants. However, it is subsequently revealed that the 'Richards' they have been invited to defeat are actually members of the "Council of Reeds" (alternate versions of Reed who were trapped in this universe by Valeria a while back, possessing Reed's intellect while lacking his conscience).

While Spider-Man and Invisible Woman make sandwiches for the kids, Mister Fantastic, Doctor Doom, Valeria, and Nathaniel Richards meet with the supervillain geniuses and Uatu the Watcher to discuss about what to do with the Council of Reeds.

During Reed's discussion with the supervillains, Invisible Woman, Spider-Man, and Alex Power go to Old Atlantis where they find Mole Man and an alternate Mister Fantastic attacking it.

While the Future Foundation is dealing with the remaining Alternate Reed Richards, Black Bolt suddenly returns to the Universal Inhumans. It was revealed that Black Bolt was trapped in the Fault following the events of War of Kings. Black Bolt was able to hold his own, but he was unable to escape until Lockjaw found him. After killing the minister who objected to return to Earth's moon, Black Bolt and the rest of the Inhuman Royal Family returns to the moon as do the other Inhumans, the Badoon, the Centaurians, the Kymellians, and the Dire Wraiths. The prophecy that ended the Inhuman experiments spoke of five brides and one king with a mighty voice. However, another prophecy comes closer to fruition which ended up being a prophecy of four cities and a war to shatter everything.

Spider-Man and the Future Foundation investigate several rifts in the space-time continuum: one in the Microverse, another in the distant future, and another on present-day Earth. Spider-Man and the Future Foundation arrive on a Caribbean island where the tribal natives are being attacked by zombie pirates. When Franklin Richards claims that the battle is similar to the Scooby-Doo cartoons, Invisible Woman uses her powers to discover that one of the zombie pirates is actually Mysterio in disguise. It also turns out that the tribal chief is a disguised Chameleon. Soon the rest of the Sinister Six arrive, though Spider-Man comes to realize that Doctor Octopus, Electro, Rhino, and Sandman are all robots. Meanwhile, the real Doctor Octopus infiltrates the Baxter Building to look for specific technology plans.

During the "Fear Itself" storyline, the Future Foundation is analyzing one of the seven hammers that fell from the sky and landed near the Baxter Building. The Thing ends up lifting it and is transformed into Angrir, Breaker of Souls. Although the Thing is almost killed in battle by Thor, Franklin is able to use his powers to restore him to his original rocky form.

The Future Foundation discovers that Human Torch is alive and that the insects implanted into him by Annihilus revived him. Human Torch was surprised that his teammates have formed the Future Foundation in his absence.

When the Future Foundation visit Africa, one of their visits is Wakanda. Valeria meets Onome, the daughter of a Wakandan engineer. Valeria secures a spot for Onome with the Future Foundation.

During the "Secret Wars" storyline, most of the Future Foundation members are loaded into Mister Fantastic's lifeboat during the final Incursion between Earth-616 and Earth-1610. A hull breach occurs, separating the part of the ship carrying Invisible Woman, Thing and most of the young Future Foundation where they are destroyed by the Incursion before Mister Fantastic can rescue them. When the Multiverse is restored, Mister Fantastic, Invisible Woman, Valeria, Franklin, the members of Future Foundation, and Molecule Man work to restore the Multiverse one reality at a time with Molecule Man creating clones of himself as anchors.

Some years later, the Future Foundation, Mister Fantastic, and Invisible Woman are confronted by the Griever at the End of All Things after Franklin's reality-warping abilities have become depleted. When Molecule Man is killed by the Griever, Mister Fantastic persuades Griever to let him summon Human Torch and Thing. Griever agrees to the condition as Mister Fantastic summons them and anyone else that has been a part of the Fantastic Four at some points in their lives, including Iceman. After Griever is defeated and retreat to her home-world, all of the expanded Fantastic Four members, and Iceman returns to their former locations. However, due to the device to transport to Earth-616 is limited since it was temporarily destroyed to prevent Griever from invading the said Earth, Dragon Man and the other staying Foundation members sacrifice their turn for the Fantastic Four and both Franklin and Valeria to return to their home-world, as the latter are needed there, with the Foundation continues their journey across the multiverse.

Members
The Future Foundation consists of a combat team along with a science team, with some members being part of both groups. Other groups include a replacement group for the core members of the original Fantastic Four as well as a temporary supervillain group.

The Future Foundation

Current members
 Alex Power
 Julie Power
 Leech
 Artie
 Bentley-23 - A clone of the Wizard
 Dragon Man
 Onome - The daughter of one of Wakanda's greatest engineers
 Vil - The female co-heir to the Uhari throne
 Wu - The male co-heir to the Uhari throne
 Mik - An evolved Moloid who identifies itself as a male
 Korr - An evolved Moloid who identified itself as a male
 Turg - An evolved Moloid who identified itself as a male
 Tong - An evolved Moloid who formerly identified itself as a male and now identifies itself as a female

Former members
 Luna
 Medusa
 Mister Fantastic
 Invisible Woman
 Thing
 Human Torch
 Spider-Man
 Doctor Doom
 Valeria Richards
 Franklin Richards
 Original Earth-616
 Earth-10235
 Valeria Richards from Earth-10235
 Nathaniel Richards
 Ant-Man
 She-Hulk
 Adolf - The son of the Impossible Man
 Ms. Thing

Council of Doom
The following supervillain geniuses were recruited by Mister Fantastic and Doctor Doom to deal with the alternate Mister Fantastics:

 Diablo
 High Evolutionary
 Mad Thinker
 Wizard

Other versions

Ultimate Marvel
In Ultimate Marvel's Ultimate Comics: The Ultimates, the Maker (Reed Richards as a villain) sets up an experiment inside a dome to force people to evolve or become extinct. His test subjects are wearing a variation of the Future Foundation costume, and Reed welcomes them "to tomorrow". It would later be revealed that these people were grown in a lab, with no contact with the outside world. Known as "The Children of Tomorrow", they would launch an attack on the super-team Excalibur including Captain Britain and coming across Thor. They wished to capture these superhumans but were very unsatisfied until they examined Thor and found a link connecting him and Yggdrasil. Realizing that the Asgardians could harm them, they would follow the link and launch a massive attack on Asgard, eventually killing all the other gods except Thor.

In the wake of the Cataclysm crossover, a new Future Foundation title was launched, starring Susan Storm, Falcon, Iron Man, Machine Man (Danny Ketch), and Phil Coulson. The book was written by Joshua Hale Fialkov and drawn by Mario Guevra.

Secret Wars (2015)
During the Secret Wars storyline, there is a group called the Foundation that is based on the Future Foundation where they operate at the Foundation's Department of Science in the Battleworld domain of Doomstadt. The Foundation consists of Valeria Richards, Dragon Man, Bentley-32, Minister Alex Powers, Psycho-Man, a variation of Nostradamus, and Night Machine (a variation of Nikola Tesla).

In other media

Film
In 2015 Fantastic Four film, the team wore white outfits based on the Future Foundation uniforms.

Video games
 Spider-Man's Future Foundation costume is unlockable in Spider-Man: Edge of Time.
 A colour-inverted version of the Future Foundation costume is unlockable in The Amazing Spider-Man (2012 video game).
 The Future Foundation costumes for Mister Fantastic, Invisible Woman, Thing, and Spider-Man are featured as unlockable costumes in Marvel: Avengers Alliance.
 The Future Foundation costumes for Spider-Man, Mister Fantastic, Invisible Woman, Thing, and Doctor Doom appear in Marvel Super Hero Squad Online.
 The Future Foundation costumes for Mister Fantastic, Invisible Woman, Thing, and Human Torch appear in Marvel Super War.
 The Future Foundation costumes for Spider-Man, Thing, Mister Fantastic, Invisible Woman, and Doctor Doom appear in Marvel Heroes.
 The Future Foundation costumes for Mister Fantastic, The Thing, Invisible Woman, and Spider-Man appear as their alternate costumes in Lego Marvel Super Heroes.
 Spider-Man's Future Foundation costume is available in Spider-Man Unlimited.
 Spider-Man's Future Foundation costume is available in Marvel's Spider-Man.
Spider-Man's Future Foundation costume was available in Fortnite Battle Royale as an unlockable bonus style for the Spider-Man outfit in the Chapter 3 Season 1 Battle Pass.

Collected editions

References

External links
 Future Foundation at Marvel Wiki
 Future Foundation at Comic Vine
 Spider-Man Joins The FF!

Fantastic Four
Fictional explorers
Fictional families
Marvel Comics superhero teams
Superhero comics
Comics by Jonathan Hickman